Serge Mayifuila is a Congolese-born business owner, philanthropist and a father of one child. He studied Mechanical Engineering at the University of Maryland, Baltimore County. He owns congoglobal.com and is a member of Arche de L'Unite and APEMA, two Congolese NGOs.

References

External links 
 UMBC 
 EWB-UMBC:
 Congoglobal 
 APEMA:

Democratic Republic of the Congo businesspeople
Year of birth missing (living people)
Place of birth missing (living people)
University of Maryland, Baltimore County alumni
Living people